is a commuter railway station on the Enoshima Electric Railway (Enoden) located in the city of Fujisawa, Kanagawa Prefecture, Japan.

Lines
Shōnankaigankōen Station is served by the Enoshima Electric Railway Main Line and is 2.7 kilometers from the terminus of the line at Fujisawa Station.

Station layout
The station consists of a single side platform serving one track for bi-directional traffic. There is no station building and the station is unattended.

Platforms

History 
It was renamed to its present name on 1 December 1958.

Station numbering was introduced to the Enoshima Electric Railway January 2014 with Shōnankaigankōen being assigned station number EN05.

Passenger statistics
In fiscal 2019, the station was used by an average of 1,976 passengers daily, making it the 12th used of the 15 Enoden stations 

The passenger figures for previous years are as shown below.

Surrounding area
Shōnankaigan Park
Shōnan Beach
 Suwa Shrine

See also
 List of railway stations in Japan

References

External links

 Enoden station information 
Enoden station information (in English)

Railway stations in Kanagawa Prefecture
Railway stations in Japan opened in 1904
Railway stations in Fujisawa, Kanagawa